Dharampur is a village in Bishnupur CD Block in Bishnupur subdivision of Bankura district in the state of West Bengal, India

Demographics
As per 2011 Census of India Dharampur had a total population of 1,239 of which 637 (60%) were males and 602 (50%) were females. The total number of households in Dharampur was 272. Total area of this village was 131.52 hectares.

Transport
The Bishnupur-Sonamukhi Road passes through Dharampur.

Healthcare
Bhara Public Health Centre functions as the central facility in Bhara. The villagers take free medicine and treatment from this hospital.

References

Villages in Bankura district